The Ministry for Development of Economy and Trade is the main authority in the system of central government of Ukraine responsible for formation and realization of state economic and social development policies (business economics); regulation of consumer prices; industrial, investment and trade economic policies; development of entrepreneurship; technical regulation and security of consumer rights; inter-agency coordination of economic and social cooperation of Ukraine with the European Union. In 2019-2020 it also encompassed functions of the Ministry of Agrarian Policy and Food. 

The ministry is based on the former Ministry of Economy, taking its origin from the Planning Commission of the Ukrainian SSR. Over the years it included such former ministries as Ministry of Trade and Ministry of Foreign Economic Relations. Activities of the current ministry are coordinated by the Cabinet of Ministers of Ukraine.

Structure

The ministry consists of the central body of ministry headed by its leadership composed of a minister, first deputy and other deputies to assist the minister. Ministry elects several state administrations representatives to coordinate operations of the government companies.

Between September an mid-December 2020 the ministry was also responsible for Ukraine's agricultural policy. On 29 August 2019 the Honcharuk Government merged the Ministry of Agrarian Policy and Food into the ministry. On 17 December 2020 the agricultural ministry was resurrected when Roman Leshchenko was appointed as Minister of Agricultural Policy and Food of the Shmyhal Government.

State agencies
 State Agency of Ukraine in governing the state corporate rights and properties
 State Agency of Reserves of Ukraine
 State Agency in investments and national projects of Ukraine (Ukrproject)
 State Agency in energy efficiency and energy conservation of Ukraine
 State Service of Statistics of Ukraine
 State Service of Export Control of Ukraine
 State Inspection in Protection of Consumers' Rights 
 National Accreditation Agency of Ukraine
(until 2011 State Committee for Technical Regulation and Consumer Policy)

List of Ministers

Trade

Foreign Relations

Economy

Yulia Svyrydenko is since 4 November 2021 simultaneous First Vice Prime Minister of Ukraine and Minister of Economic Development.

See also
Cabinet of Ministers of Ukraine

References

External links 
 Official Website of the Ukrainian Ministry of Economic Development and Trade
 Textile Companies of Ukraine. Catalog.

 
Economic Development and Trade
Ukraine
Economic Development